Lyon Mountain is a mountain located in the Catskill Mountains of New York south of Hobart. Cowan Mountain is located east of Lyon Mountain and Griffin Hill is located north.

References

Mountains of Delaware County, New York
Mountains of New York (state)